Satya Bahin is an Indian politician . She was a Member of Parliament, representing Uttar Pradesh in the Rajya Sabha the upper house of India's Parliament as a member of the Indian National Congress

References

1944 births
Living people
Rajya Sabha members from Uttar Pradesh
Indian National Congress politicians from Uttar Pradesh
Women in Uttar Pradesh politics
Women members of the Rajya Sabha